The 2013 Quicken Loans 400 was a NASCAR Sprint Cup Series stock car race held on June 16, 2013, at Michigan International Speedway in Brooklyn, Michigan, United States. Contested over 200 laps on the two–mile (3.2 km) superspeedway, it was the fifteenth race of the 2013 Sprint Cup Series championship. Greg Biffle of Roush Fenway Racing won the race, his first win of the 2013 season, while Kevin Harvick finished second. Martin Truex Jr., Kyle Busch, and Tony Stewart rounded out the top five. It was also Biffle's 19th Cup Series win.

Report

Background

Opened in 1968, the track's turns are banked at eighteen degrees, while the 3,600-foot-long front stretch, the location of the finish line, is banked at twelve degrees. The back stretch, has a five degree banking and is 2,242 feet long. Michigan International Speedway has a grandstand seating capacity of 71,000 people, with 13,000 seats having been removed from turns 3 and 4 since the race weekend in August 2012. Dale Earnhardt Jr. was the defending race winner, having won the event in 2012.

Before the race, Jimmie Johnson was leading the Drivers' Championship with 521 points, while Carl Edwards stood in second with 470 points. Clint Bowyer followed in the third with 452, thirteen points ahead of fourth-placed Earnhardt Jr. and eighteen ahead of fifth-placed Kevin Harvick. Matt Kenseth, with 418, was in sixth; six ahead of Kyle Busch, who was scored seventh. Eighth-placed Kasey Kahne was two points ahead of ninth-placed Brad Keselowski and five ahead of Greg Biffle, who rounded out the top ten. Jeff Gordon was eleventh with 393, while Paul Menard completed the first twelve positions with 385 points. In the Manufacturers' Championship, Chevrolet was leading with 101 points, thirteen points ahead of Toyota. Ford was third after recording only 70 points before the race.

Practice and qualifying

Three practice sessions were held before the race. The first session, held on June 14, 2013, was 90 minutes long. The second and third sessions, held a day later on June 15, were 55 and 60 minutes long, respectively. During the first practice session, Kasey Kahne was quickest with a fastest time of 35.889 seconds. Kurt Busch, who was 0.068 seconds slower, followed in second, ahead of Aric Almirola in third and Kevin Harvick in fourth. With a fastest time of 36.014 seconds, Dale Earnhardt Jr. managed to be fifth quickest.

During qualifying, forty-four cars were entered, meaning only one car would not obtain a spot in the race per NASCAR's qualifying procedure. After his qualifying run, Edwards commented on his results, saying, "This is one lap, and it's good. I'm really happy. The process that's going to put us out front of Hendrick Motorsports and the guys at Joe Gibbs Racing and the rest of the guys we race against on Sunday, this process is just starting. We can use these positive things, like the pole position, hopefully a win, Greg [Biffle's] run last week, we can move forward. We've just got to keep moving forward. There's not a faster car in the place than our car today, and that's a big deal.” He was joined on the front row of the grid by Kurt Busch. Kasey Kahne qualified third, Paul Menard took fourth, and Aric Almirola ranked fifth. Joey Logano, Austin Dillon, Matt Kenseth, Kyle Busch, and Juan Pablo Montoya completed the first ten positions on the grid. The driver who failed to qualify for the race was Scott Riggs.

In the Saturday morning practice session, Kurt Busch was quickest with a fastest lap time of 35.829 seconds, over two-tenths ahead of Carl Edwards in second and Jimmie Johnson in third. Paul Menard and Mark Martin followed in the fourth and fifth positions, respectively. Kasey Kahne, Greg Biffle, Denny Hamlin, Kevin Harvick, and Aric Almirola rounded out the first ten positions. In the final practice session for the race, Kurt Busch remained quickest with a time of 36.480 seconds, 0.651 slower than his fastest time of the second practice session. Kahne followed in second, ahead of Martin in third and Johnson in fourth. Edwards, who was second-quickest in second practice, could only manage fifth.

Race
The race began with Kurt Busch colliding with pole-sitter Carl Edwards in turn 2 on the opening lap in an attempt to grab the lead. Edwards lost multiple positions as a result, and Kurt Busch emerged in front. The first caution flew on lap 6, after Bobby Labonte got loose and spun in turn 2, collecting Jeff Gordon. A competition caution was thrown on lap 20 for the previous night's rain. Kurt Busch lost the lead to Joey Logano during this caution, and only three laps after the subsequent restart, on lap 29, Busch got loose off of turn two and crashed down the back-straightaway.

Afterward, multiple caution flags and different pit stop strategies gave Joey Logano, Jamie McMurray, Jimmie Johnson, Dale Earnhardt Jr., and Kasey Kahne turns at leading the race. At one point, Johnson rebounded to the second position after falling to twelfth as a result of a mistake made on a restart. On lap 104 and while leading the race, Kahne experienced a right-front tire failure and crashed into the outside wall in turn 1, setting his car ablaze and eliminating him from the event. Fortunately, Kahne was not harmed by the impact or the fire. Johnson took over the lead but lost it to Earnhardt during pit stops. On the restart on lap 113, Earnhardt began to pull away from Kenseth and Biffle as Johnson struggled to battle back to the front. Several laps later, Earnhardt developed engine problems and fell off the pace, giving Johnson (who had successfully passed Kenseth and Biffle) the lead. After a few slow laps, Earnhardt's engine blew up, bringing out another caution on lap 131. After taking four tires in the pits, Johnson fell to 20th and Edwards took the lead ahead of Logano, Kenseth, and Biffle.

Following the restart on lap 136, Biffle worked his way past both Kenseth and Logano into second and proceeded to chase down Edwards, passing him for the lead on lap 150 and quickly pulling away afterward. A caution for a right-front tire failure on the car of McMurray occurred in the middle of the last round of pit stops, trapping Edwards a lap down (although he would immediately receive the free pass). Biffle, who had pitted under the green but did not go a lap down, cycled out as the leader. On the lap of the restart (lap 174), Kenseth got loose off of turn two, causing him to drop several positions while Johnson, who restarted tenth, began to pass cars. Johnson gradually worked his way through the field, eventually passing Harvick to move into second with eight laps to go. However, as Johnson struggled to catch Biffle, he experienced a right-front tire failure off of turn 2 on lap 198, causing him to make contact with the outside wall and relegating him to a 28th-place finish after having to pit to address the tire. Biffle sped away to take the victory over Harvick, Martin Truex Jr., Kyle Busch, and Tony Stewart. Biffle's win was the 615th race victory for the Ford marque and 715th for Ford Motor Company in the Cup Series. It was also the 1,000th race victory for Ford Motor Company in NASCAR's three national touring series.

Results

Qualifying

Race results

Notes

 Points include 3 Chase for the Sprint Cup points for winning, 1 point for leading a lap, and 1 point for most laps led.

Standings after the race

Drivers' Championship standings

Manufacturers' Championship standings

Note: Only the first twelve positions are included for the driver standings.

References

Quicken
Quicken
Quicken Loans 400
NASCAR races at Michigan International Speedway